Jared Abrahamson is a Canadian actor. He is known for his performance in the 2016 film Hello Destroyer, for which he was nominated for a Canadian Screen Award for Best Actor and won the award for Best Actor in a Canadian Film at the Vancouver Film Critics Circle Awards 2016.

Early life and education
Jared Abrahamson is originally from Flin Flon, Manitoba, Canada. He studied acting at the Vancouver Film School.

Career
Abrahamson is known for his performance in the 2016 film Hello Destroyer, for which he was nominated for a Canadian Screen Award for Best Actor and won the award for Best Actor in a Canadian Film at the Vancouver Film Critics Circle Awards 2016.

He portrayed Trevor Holden in the Showcase and Netflix series Travelers. 

He was named one of the Toronto International Film Festival's Rising Stars of 2016, alongside Grace Glowicki, Mylène Mackay and Sophie Nélisse. 

Abrahamson has also appeared in the television series Awkward and Fear the Walking Dead, Letterkenny, and the films The Submarine Kid and Never Steady, Never Still.

Filmography

Films

Television

Awards and nominations

References

External links
 

Canadian male film actors
Canadian male television actors
Male actors from Manitoba
Male actors from Vancouver
Living people
People from Flin Flon
Canadian male web series actors
21st-century Canadian male actors
Year of birth missing (living people)